Pacific Islands is a computer game published by Empire Interactive in 1992 for the MS-DOS, Amiga and Atari ST. It is the sequel to the 1987 video game, Team Yankee.

Plot
Pacific Islands is a tank simulation game involving platoon-style combat. A member of the Soviet Communist Party has seized control of the fictitious Yama Yama Isles in the South Pacific that are an important outpost for the Western nations. The player will have to regain control of the islands in five missions.

Reception
Computer Gaming World criticized Pacific Islandss lack of infantry (making the machines guns useless) or air power (despite the aircraft on the box art), both faults that existed with Team Yankee. The magazine concluded that it "comes closer to a Nintendo game than a wargame". The game was reviewed in 1993 in Dragon #189 by Hartley, Patricia, and Kirk Lesser in "The Role of Computers" column. The reviewers gave the game 4 out of 5 stars.

Reviews
ST Format - Jun, 1992
Amiga Computing - Jun, 1992
CU Amiga - May, 1992
ASM (Aktueller Software Markt) - Jul, 1992
ASM (Aktueller Software Markt) - Aug, 1992
Amiga Format (Jun, 1992)
Amiga Action (May, 1992)
ST Action] (Mar, 1993)
Amiga Power (May, 1992)
Zero (Jun, 1992)
Amiga Joker (May, 1992)
The One for Amiga Games (May, 1992)
Play Time (Oct, 1992)

References

External links

Review in Compute!

1992 video games
Amiga games
Atari ST games
DOS games
Empire Interactive games
Video game sequels
Video games developed in the United Kingdom
Video games set on islands